The 1949 Omloop Het Volk was the fifth edition of the Omloop Het Volk cycle race and was held on 13 March 1949. The race started and finished in Ghent. The race was won by André Declerck.

General classification

References

1949
Omloop Het Nieuwsblad
Omloop Het Nieuwsblad